Mezdeh (also Romanized as Mazdeh; also known as Maija and Mazdābād) is a village in Tarq Rud Rural District, in the Central District of Natanz County, Isfahan Province, Iran. At the 2006 census, its population was 203, in 71 families.

References 

Populated places in Natanz County